Jasmina Barhoumi (born 8 September 2002) is a German-born Tunisian footballer who plays as a defender for 2. Frauen-Bundesliga club 1. FFC 08 Niederkirchen and the Tunisia women's national team.

Club career
Barhoumi has played for FC Speyer 09, TSV Schott Mainz and 1. FFC Niederkirchen in Germany.

International career
Barhoumi has capped for Tunisia at senior level, including a 2021 Arab Women's Cup match against Lebanon on 24 August 2021.

Collegiate Career
Barhoumi joined the D'Youville Saints as a freshman in the 2022 season, enrolling at D'Youville University in Buffalo, NY, USA.

See also
List of Tunisia women's international footballers

References

External links

2002 births
Living people
Citizens of Tunisia through descent
Tunisian women's footballers
Women's association football defenders
Tunisia women's international footballers
German women's footballers
TSV Schott Mainz players
2. Frauen-Bundesliga players
German people of Tunisian descent
1. FFC 08 Niederkirchen players